Sir Samuel Barnardiston, 2nd Baronet (28 January 1659 – 3 January 1709) was an English MP and Barrister. He lived at Brightwell, Suffolk.

Barnardiston was admitted to Gray's Inn on 10 February 1679. He was M.P. for Ipswich between 1698 and 1700.

He succeeded to the title of 2nd Baronet Barnardiston, of Brightwell Hall, Suffolk on 8 November 1707, on the death of his uncle, Sir Samuel Barnardiston, 1st Baronet. He married Martha Richmond, daughter of Thomas Richmond, on 13 August 1709, with a portion of £6,000.

He died on 3 January 1709 at age 49 at Charter House yard, Middlesex, without issue. He was buried on 11 January 1709 at Ketton, Suffolk. His will (dated 20 January 1709) was probated in December 1711.

Sources

http://www.thepeerage.com/i117.htm#s1679

Notes

1659 births
1709 deaths
Barn
English MPs 1698–1700
Members of Gray's Inn
Samuel
Baronets in the Baronetage of England
People from Suffolk Coastal (district)